The Siuntio Church Village is a rural village of the Siuntio municipality in Uusimaa, Finland. At the end of 2020, the village had 353 inhabitants. The village was the former administrative center of the municipality before it was moved in the 1950s into the Siuntio Station Area, which grew larger in terms of population because of the Siuntio railway station.

The Church Village is, as its name suggests, known for its medieval stone church, St. Peter's Church. The village also houses the Siuntio Homestead Museum, which tells about the local history of the area.

References

External links
 Siuntio Church Village's location at Fonecta

Siuntio
Villages in Finland